The Immigration Act 1959/63, is a Malaysian law which relates to immigration.

Structure
The Immigration Act 1959/63, in its current form (1 January 2006), consists of 7 Parts containing 74 sections and no schedule (including 20 amendments).
 Part I: Preliminary
 Part II: Admission into and Departure from Malaysia
 Part III: Entry Permits
 Part IV: Procedure on Arrival in Malaysia
 Part V: Removal from Malaysia
 Part VI: Miscellaneous
 Part VII: Special Provisions for East Malaysia
 Chapter 1: General
 Chapter 2: Special Provisions
 Chapter 3: Supplementary

See also
Immigration Act

References

External links
 Immigration Act 1959/63 

1959 in Malayan law
1963 in Malaysian law
Malaysian federal legislation
Malaysian immigration law